André Sanita (born 28 March 1992) is a German fencer. He competed in the men's team foil event at the 2020 Summer Olympics.

References

External links
 

1992 births
Living people
German male fencers
Olympic fencers of Germany
Fencers at the 2020 Summer Olympics
People from Solingen
Sportspeople from Düsseldorf (region)